Radio Television Hong Kong (RTHK) is a public broadcasting service in Hong Kong. The station produced and won many internationally awarded documentaries during the months-long 2019 Hong Kong Anti-Extradition protests.

2020 US International Film & Video Festival

2020 New York Festivals TV & Films Awards

2020 The Human Rights Press Awards

2020 World Media Festivals

See also 
 RTHK
 2019 Hong Kong Protests

References

Lists of awards by company
RTHK